Joaquín Eduardo Lopez (born February 12, 1990) is a Brazilian field hockey player. He competed for the Brazil men's national field hockey team at the 2016 Summer Olympics.

References

External links
 

1990 births
Living people
Brazilian male field hockey players
Olympic field hockey players of Brazil
Field hockey players at the 2016 Summer Olympics
South American Games bronze medalists for Brazil
South American Games medalists in field hockey
Competitors at the 2018 South American Games
Competitors at the 2022 South American Games
People from Neuquén
Argentine male field hockey players
21st-century Brazilian people